Mishoodaghi Mount is a mountain range in East Azerbaijan Province of Iran. It is located between Tasouj, Marand, and Shabestar cities. Mishodaghi peak has several peaks including: Ali-Alamdar (highest peak 3155 m), Falak daghi, Kooseh-Baba, and Uzoun-Bel. Yam Ski Resort is located in northern foot hills of Mishodaghi.

Mishoodaghi has a diverse wild life. Since 2007, it is considered a protected area by Department of Environmental of Iran.

The best access route to Mishoodaghi is Road 32 (Iran) in between Tabriz-Marand. This road passes through north eastern hills of Mishoodaghi.

References

External link

Mountains of Iran
Tourist attractions in East Azerbaijan Province
Landforms of East Azerbaijan Province